Xiazayü is a town of Zayü County, in southeastern Tibet Autonomous Region, People's Republic of China (PRC), located in a deep river valley  from the county seat and bordering India's Arunachal Pradesh, which is claimed by the PRC, to the southwest, as well as Burma to the southeast.

The town contains a population of the Mishmi people (or Deng people), which has yet to be officially recognised as one of the PRC's 56 ethnicities. Tourism was developing in the Shaqiong Deng Village. However, foreigners were not allowed to enter Zayü as of 2011.

References 

Township-level divisions of Tibet
Populated places in Nyingchi